Hakulinen is a Finnish surname. Notable people with the surname include:

 Anrei Hakulinen (born 1990), Finnish ice hockey player
 Auli Hakulinen, Finnish linguist
 Herman Hakulinen (1866–1928), Finnish politician
 Jussi Hakulinen (1964–2022), Finnish rock musician and singer-songwriter
 Lauri Hakulinen, Finnish linguist
 Rainar Hakulinen, (1918–1991), Finnish lichenologist
 Veikko Hakulinen, Finnish cross-country skier

Finnish-language surnames